The Norfolk mayoral election of 2016 took place on May 3, 2016. Voters elected the Mayor of Norfolk. It saw the election of Kenny Alexander.

Alexander became the first African American mayor of Norfolk.

Results

See also 
 2016 Virginia elections

References 
 

2016 Virginia elections
2016 United States mayoral elections
2016